John Michael Scalzi II (born May 10, 1969) is an American science fiction author and former president of the Science Fiction and Fantasy Writers of America. He is best known for his Old Man's War series, three novels of which have been nominated for the Hugo Award, and for his blog Whatever, where he has written on a number of topics since 1998. He won the Hugo Award for Best Fan Writer in 2008 based predominantly on that blog, which he has also used for several charity drives. His novel Redshirts won the 2013 Hugo Award for Best Novel. He has written non-fiction books and columns on diverse topics such as finance, video games, films, astronomy, writing and politics, and served as a creative consultant for the TV series Stargate Universe.

Early life, education, and early career
Scalzi was born in Fairfield, California, on May 10, 1969. One of three children to a single mother, he grew up in the Los Angeles suburbs of Covina, Glendora, Azusa, and San Dimas. He is of Italian descent.

Scalzi grew up reading science fiction and mystery, which inspired him to become a science fiction writer—a decision made randomly. As he recalled in an interview with the Dayton Daily News:When I decided to start writing novels, I wanted to write in a genre I already knew and loved as a reader. So, it was either going to be science fiction or mystery. I decided to flip a coin. Heads was science fiction. Tails was mystery. The coin came up heads.Scalzi's childhood was spent in poverty, an experience that inspired him to write his most famous essay, "Being Poor." He attended the Webb School of California, a boarding school in Claremont, on a scholarship. One of his classmates was blogger and journalist Josh Marshall.

Scalzi earned a bachelor's degree in philosophy at the University of Chicago, graduating in 1991. Scalzi's thesis advisor, for a brief time, was Saul Bellow. Scalzi abandoned his course of study with Bellow after he was elected Student Ombudsman of the University. Ted Cohen, a philosophy professor, became his next thesis advisor, but Scalzi graduated without completing his thesis project. During his 1989–1990 school year, Scalzi was the editor-in-chief of The Chicago Maroon. He began writing professionally in 1990, while a college student, working freelance for the Chicago Sun-Times.

After graduating, Scalzi became a corporate consultant and wrote opinion columns and film reviews for the Fresno Bee. His experience as a film critic influenced his writing, particularly his humorous works, as films were meant to be an accessible form of storytelling. In 1996, he and his family moved to the Washington, D.C. area after he was hired as the in-house writer and editor at AOL. He was laid off in 1998, and since then he has been a full-time freelance writer and author.

Scalzi was first elected president of the Science Fiction and Fantasy Writers of America in 2010. He was the only nominee on the ballot. He had previously run as a write-in candidate in 2007, challenging the sole ballot nominee that year, but was not successful. He left office when his third term expired on June 30, 2013, having not sought reelection to a fourth term.

He garnered significant media attention by taping raw bacon to his cat "Ghlaghghee" in September 2006. As a result of the coverage, Scalzi began maintaining a web repository for links to "All Things Bacon" on the Whatever site.

Career

Fiction

Scalzi's books are known for their humor. His style of writing has been influenced by Robert Heinlein, Orson Scott Card, and Joe Haldeman.

Scalzi's first novel, Agent to the Stars, was written in 1997 and published free to read on his website in 1999. He asked readers to donate money to him if they enjoyed the novel, and earned around $4,000 over a period of five years. Subterranean Press released a limited-edition hardcover version in July 2005, featuring cover art from Penny Arcade artist Mike Krahulik; the novel was later released in trade and mass-market paperback by Tor and audiobook by Audible. A first-contact story, it is about a young Hollywood agent hired by a space alien to make their species more appealing to humans. It received mixed reviews; Booklist called it "absurd, funny, and satirically perceptive," while Publishers Weekly criticized the plot as predictable.

Scalzi's first traditionally-published novel was Old Man's War, a military science fiction novel about a 75-year-old man who is recruited to fight a centuries-long war for human colonization of space. It was inspired by the works of Robert Heinlein, especially Starship Troopers. Scalzi intended to sell the book commercially, so he chose the genre of military science fiction because he felt it would be the most marketable. Like Agent to the Stars, it was first published on Whatever; Scalzi serialized a chapter a day in December 2002. Tor Books executive editor Patrick Nielsen Hayden offered to buy the novel, and it was published by Tor in January 2005. In 2006, Scalzi won a nomination for the Hugo Award for Best Novel for Old Man's War.

The Ghost Brigades was released in 2006. While a direct sequel to Old Man's War, it focuses not on John Perry, the protagonist of Old Man's War, but on the special forces units. The Ghost Brigades television rights was purchased by Syfy in 2014. 2006 also saw the release of The Android's Dream. A satire, it was well received by Publishers Weekly, which called it an "effervescent but intelligent romp"; it was criticized by Dave Itzkoff of The New York Times, who said it was "merely sarcastic when it should be satirical."

In August 2006, Scalzi was awarded the John W. Campbell Award for Best New Writer for best new science fiction writer of 2005.

In February 2007, a novelette set in the Old Man's War universe, called "The Sagan Diary", was published as a hardcover by Subterranean Press. Scalzi has commented that he originally wrote the book as free verse poetry, then converted it into prose format. An audio reading of "The Sagan Diary" was offered through Scalzi's website in February 2007, featuring the voices of fellow science fiction authors Elizabeth Bear, Mary Robinette Kowal, Ellen Kushner, Cherie Priest, Karen Meisner and Helen Smith. In November of the same year, Subterranean Press also made "The Sagan Diary" text freely available online. In April 2008 Audible Frontiers produced an audiobook of the novelette, read by Stephanie Wolfe.

The third novel set in the same universe, The Last Colony, was released in April 2007. It was nominated for the 2008 Hugo Award for Best Novel.

Zoe's Tale, the fourth Old Man's War novel, presenting a different view of the events covered in The Last Colony, was published in August 2008. Zoe's Tale was nominated for the Hugo Award for Best Novel in 2009.

Also in 2008, Audible.com released the audiobook anthology METAtropolis, edited by Scalzi and featuring short fiction in a shared world created by Scalzi, Elizabeth Bear, Tobias Buckell, Jay Lake, and Karl Schroeder. METAtropolis was planned from the beginning to be released as an audio anthology prior to any print edition. The audiobook featured the voices of Battlestar Galactica actors Michael Hogan, Alessandro Juliani and Kandyse McClure and was nominated for the Hugo Award for Best Dramatic Presentation, Long Form in 2009. A sequel audiobook, METAtropolis: Cascadia, edited by Jay Lake, came out in 2010. In 2009 Subterranean Press released a limited edition print run of METAtropolis, which was subsequently published by Tor in a standard hardcover edition, in 2010.

Fuzzy Nation, Scalzi's ninth novel, began as a writing exercise. Scalzi explained that it had been "basically written just for the fun of it and for sort of getting into the habit of actually enjoying writing science fiction again." It was an adaptation of Little Fuzzy, published by H. Beam Piper in 1962, and was authorized by the Piper estate. Scalzi announced the release on his blog on April 7, 2010, and the novel was published on May 10, 2011.

Scalzi has not written many short stories: one of them, "After the Coup", featured as the first short story published originally on Tor.com, was a finalist for the 2009 Locus Award for best short story. Tor released it as an e-book in 2009.

His 2012 book Redshirts: A Novel with Three Codas won the 2013 Hugo Award for Best Novel. Scalzi decided to write Redshirts after noticing that while many short satirical works dealt with the idea of "'redshirts'—the unnamed, low-ranking characters of Star Trek who always died on away missions," there was a dearth of novels exploring the concept.

On May 24, 2015, Tor announced that it had agreed to a $3.4 million deal with Scalzi spanning 10 years and 13 books: 10 adult books and three young adult books. Among the books included in this deal is another book within his Old Man's War universe, the sequel to Lock In (a near-future thriller published by Scalzi in 2014) titled Head On, a new space opera series and several standalone books. The deal was finalized on November 25, 2015. The first book produced in this contract was the space opera The Collapsing Empire in March 2017.

In 2019, three of his short stories were adapted for episodes of the first season of the Netflix anthology series Love, Death & Robots: "Three Robots", "When the Yogurt Took Over", and "Missives From Possible Futures #1: Alternate History Search Results". His story "Automated Customer Service" was also adapted for the second season of Love, Death & Robots, with Scalzi himself co-writing the script. Scalzi wrote a sequel to "Three Robots" for the third season of the series.

His 2022 novel The Kaiju Preservation Society was named a 2023 Alex Award winner as one of "ten books written for adults that have special appeal to young adults ages 12 through 18."

Non-fiction
Though best known for his science fiction works, Scalzi has written several non-fiction books as well, including a trio for London publisher Rough Guides' reference line of books. The first of these was The Rough Guide to Money Online, released in late October 2000. This reference book featured tips on using online financial tools. According to Scalzi, it did less-than-expected business, possibly due to the collapse of the Internet bubble at about the same time the book was released. Scalzi's next non-fiction book was The Rough Guide to the Universe, an astronomy book designed for novice-to-intermediate stargazers, released in May 2003. Scalzi's third book for Rough Guides, The Rough Guide to Sci-Fi Movies, was released in October 2005. This book covered the history of science fiction and science fiction film and listed a "canon" of 50 significant science fiction films.

Scalzi is also the author of the "Book of the Dumb" series of books from Portable Press. These books chronicle people doing stupid things. The first book in the series was released in October 2003 with a second following a year later.

In November 2005, Scalzi announced that entries from the run of the Whatever, his blog, would be compiled into a book from Subterranean Press. The book, You're Not Fooling Anyone When You Take Your Laptop to a Coffee Shop: Scalzi on Writing; was released by Subterranean Press in February 2007. Another collection of entries from Whatever, entitled Your Hate Mail Will Be Graded: A Decade of Whatever 1998–2008 was released in September 2008. It subsequently won the Hugo Award for Best Related Book in 2009. A third collection, The Mallet of Loving Correction, was released in 2013 and named after his nickname for moderating activities on his blog.  A fourth collection, Don't Live For Your Obituary, was released in December 2017.

Online and other writing
Scalzi began writing for his personal blog Whatever in September 1998. He started it because he wanted to practice writing in a newspaper- or column-like format, which he had done prior to his novel-writing career. The name suggests the wide range of topics Scalzi writes about there, although many of Scalzi's postings center on the topics of politics and writing. A number of writings originally posted there have gone on to be published in traditional media, including his "I Hate Your Politics" and "Being Poor" entries, the latter of which was published in the op-ed pages of the Chicago Tribune in September 2005. His essay "Being Poor" was based on his own experiences growing up in poverty.

Scalzi also used the Whatever as a way to solicit fiction and non-fiction submissions on the theme of Science Fiction Clichés in 2005 for issue No. 4 of Subterranean Magazine, which he guest edited (published in 2006 by Subterranean Press). The original solicitation was posted in March 2005 with the unique requirements that submissions would only be accepted electronically in plain text, and ONLY during the period between 10/1/05 and 11/1/05 instead of before a traditional deadline. After the print run sold out, the issue was made available online as a free download.

Scalzi's own short story, How I Proposed to My Wife: An Alien Sex Story, was not printed in the magazine itself but only in a separated chapbook reserved to the people who bought the hardcover limited edition. In April 2008 Scalzi released the story as a "shareware short story" on his website.

On March 29, 2007, it was announced that Scalzi had again been nominated for a Hugo Award, this time in the category "Best Fan Writer", for his online writing about the science fiction field. He was the first Campbell Award winner to receive a nomination in this category. In 2008, he was again nominated for the Best Fan Writer Hugo, this time winning the award, becoming the first person to be nominated for that category and the Best Novel Hugo award at the same time since 1970.

Scalzi also uses the Whatever to help raise money for organizations and causes he supports. Notably, in June 2007 he raised over $5000 in 6 days for Americans United for the Separation of Church and State after fellow writer Joe Hill challenged him to go visit the Creation Museum that had just opened near Cincinnati, not far from Scalzi's Ohio home, if Hill paid for the ticket, offering to match the cost with a donation to the charity of Scalzi's choice after he filed a comprehensive report on the trip online. Scalzi extended the deal to all Whatever readers, raised 256 times the admission price, and posted his critical report on the Creation Museum on November 12, 2007. In September 2010 he joined with Subterranean Press and authors Wil Wheaton, Patrick Rothfuss, Catherynne M. Valente, Rachel Swirsky and others to create a chapbook story collection called Clash of the Geeks, offered online in exchange for donations to the Michigan/Indiana affiliate of the Lupus Alliance of America. Some of the stories were selected from a competition run on Whatever to write a story to explain a painting Scalzi had commissioned from Jeff Zugale, that featured Scalzi as an orc and Wheaton riding a unicorn pegasus kitten.

Scalzi's notable online presence and support for feminist causes have often led to harassment and trolling. After writing a satirical blog post in October 2012 criticizing some conservative politicians for their positions on abortion, Scalzi was targeted by writer Vox Day and his supporters. Scalzi pledged to donate $5 to RAINN, Emily's List, the Human Rights Campaign, and the NAACP every time Day mentioned him on his website. While he capped his donation at $1,000, Scalzi raised over $50,000 after others, including actor Wil Wheaton, promised to match this pledge.

In addition to his personal site, Scalzi was a professional blogger for America Online's AOL Journals and AIM Blogs service from August 2003 through December 2007. In this role he created participatory entries (most notably the Weekend Assignment and Monday Photo Shoot), answered questions about blogging from AOL members, and posted interesting links for readers. Readers of both Scalzi's personal site and his AOL Journal "By the Way" noted distinct differences in tone at each site. Scalzi has acknowledged this tonal difference, based on the different missions of each site. Scalzi also blogged professionally for AOL's Ficlets site beginning in March 2007, writing about literature and other related topics. On December 7, 2007, Scalzi announced that by mutual agreement, his contract with AOL would not be renewed at the end of the year, in part so that he would have more time to devote to writing books.

In 2008, Scalzi began writing a weekly column on science fiction/fantasy films for AMCTV.com, the Web site of cable television network AMC.

For traditional media, Scalzi wrote a DVD review column and an opinion column for the Official U.S. PlayStation Magazine from 2000 through 2006, wrote an additional DVD review column for the Dayton Daily News through 2006, and writes for other magazines and newspapers on an occasional basis. He also works as a consultant for businesses, primarily in the online and financial fields.

In 2009, Scalzi was a creative consultant on science-fiction television show Stargate Universe. He was credited as such for 39 episodes.

On April 1, 2011, Tor Books collaborated with Scalzi on an April Fool's prank, with Tor claiming "Tor Books is proud to announce the launch of John Scalzi's new fantasy trilogy, The Shadow War of the Night Dragons, which kicks off with book one: The Dead City." This excerpt from an imaginary novel took on a life of its own, winning the 2011 Tor.com Readers' Choice Awards for short fiction. It was also nominated for the 2012 Hugo Award for Best Short Story. This was followed up on April 1, 2013 by an "announcement" about a musical production based on the series.

Scalzi was the writer for the 2015 mobile device video game by Industrial Toys, called Midnight Star. Scalzi wrote the story for the prequel to the game, in a graphic novel called Midnight Rises.

On March 30, 2016, the Los Angeles Times announced that Scalzi was one of ten "Critics-at-Large" who would contribute to the newspaper as a columnist writing on literature and culture.

Personal life
He met his wife Kristine Ann Blauser when he was living in Fresno, and they married in 1995. His only child, a daughter named Athena, was born in 1998. He and his family live in Bradford, Ohio, where they moved to be closer to his wife's family. Scalzi has declared himself a feminist and, formerly, a Rockefeller Republican,  though he currently supports the Democratic Party. He supports same-sex marriage and the LGBTQ community.

Bibliography

Series fiction

Old Man's War universe
 Old Man's War (2005, Tor Books)
 Questions for a Soldier (December 2005, chapbook, Subterranean Press)
 The Ghost Brigades (February 2006, Tor Books)
 The Sagan Diary (February 2007, Subterranean Press)
 The Last Colony (April 2007, Tor Books)
 Zoe's Tale (August 2008, Tor Books)
 After the Coup (July 2008, ebook, Tor.com)
 The Human Division (January – April 2013, serialized ebooks; collected, May 2013, Tor Books)
 The End of All Things (June 2015, serialized ebooks; collected, August 2015, Tor Books)

The Android's Dream universe
 The Android's Dream (October 2006, Tor Books)
 Judge Sn Goes Golfing (December 2009, chapbook, Subterranean Press)

Lock In universe 
 Unlocked: An Oral History of Haden's Syndrome (Novella, May 2014, Subterranean Press)
 Lock In (August 2014, Tor Books)
 Head On (April 2018, Tor Books)

The Interdependency series 
 The Collapsing Empire (March 2017, Tor Books)
 The Consuming Fire (October 2018, Tor Books)
 The Last Emperox (April 2020, Tor Books)

The Dispatcher series 
 The Dispatcher (October 2016, audiobook, Audible Studios ; April 2017, ebook, Subterranean Press; May 2017, hardcover, Subterranean Press)
 Murder by Other Means (September 2020, audiobook, Audible Studios ; April 2021, ebook, Subterranean Press; April 2021, hardcover, Subterranean Press, })
 Travel by Bullet (September 2022, audiobook, Audible Originals)

Stand-alone fiction

Stand-alone novels
 Agent to the Stars (available on Scalzi's website in 1999; August 2005 Subterranean Press, ; October 2008, Tor Books)
 Fuzzy Nation (May 2011, Tor Books)
 Redshirts (June 2012, Tor Books)
 The Kaiju Preservation Society (March 15th, 2022, Tor Books)

Stand-alone novellas and novelettes
 The God Engines (December 2009, Subterranean Press)

Stand-alone short fiction
 "Alien Animal Encounters" (Strange Horizons (online), October 15, 2001)
 "New Directives for Employee – Manxtse Relations" (published in Chapbook titled "Sketches of Daily Life: Two Missives From Possible Futures" by Subterranean Press, 2005. Chapbook also reprinted "Alien Animal Encounters")
 "Missives from Possible Futures #1: Alternate History Search Results" (Subterranean Magazine, online edition, February 2007)
 "How I Proposed to My Wife: An Alien Sex Story" (chapbook, Subterranean Press, 2007; available as shareware in April 2008)
 "Pluto Tells All" (Subterranean Magazine, online edition), May 2007
 "Utere nihil non extra quiritationem suis" (METAtropolis, Audible.com, 2008, Subterranean Press 2009, Tor Books 2010)
 "Denise Jones, Super Booker" (Subterranean Magazine, online edition), September 2008)
 "The Tale of the Wicked" ('The New Space Opera 2 anthology, June 2009)
 "The President's Brain is Missing" (Tor.com, July 2010)
 "An Election" (Subterranean Magazine presented story on Scalzi's blog, online edition), November 2010
 "The Other Large Thing" (Short story first published on Tweetdeck's "Deck.Ly" reprinted on Scalzi's blog), August 2011
 "Muse of Fire" (Subterranean Press, September 9, 2013)
 Miniatures: The Very Short Fiction of John Scalzi (Short story collection published by Subterranean Press, December 31, 2016)
 A Very Scalzi Christmas (Short story collection published by Subterranean Press, November  2019)

Non-fiction books
 The Rough Guide to Money Online (October 2000, Rough Guide Books)
 The Rough Guide to the Universe (May 2003, Rough Guide Books)
 The Book of the Dumb (November 2003, Portable Press)
 The Book of the Dumb 2 (November 2004, Portable Press)
 The Rough Guide to Sci-Fi Movies (October 2005, Rough Guide Books)
 You're Not Fooling Anyone When You Take Your Laptop to a Coffee Shop: Scalzi on Writing (2007, Subterranean Press)
 Your Hate Mail Will Be Graded: Selected Writing, 1998–2008 (2008, Subterranean Press).
 The Mallet of Loving Correction (2013, Subterranean Press)
 Don't Live For Your Obituary: Advice, Commentary and Personal Observations on Writing, 2008–2017 (2017, Subterranean Press )

Editor
 Subterranean Magazine, #4 (2006, Subterranean Press)
 METAtropolis (2008, Audible; 2009, Subterranean Press   ; 2010 Tor Books)

Awards and nominations
 In 2005, he earned the John W. Campbell Award for Best New Writer for his debut novel Old Man's War In 2006, Old Man's War was nominated for the Hugo Award for Best Novel, and was a finalist for the Locus Award for Best First Novel
 In 2007, he received the Geffen Award for best-translated science fiction novel for Old Man's War, translated by Raz Greenberg
 In 2007, The Ghost Brigades was a nominee for the Prometheus Award
 In 2007, "Missives from Possible Futures #1: Alternate History Search Results" was a finalist for the Sidewise Award for Alternate History
 In 2007, he was nominated for the Hugo Award for Best Fan Writer
 In 2008, he won the Hugo Award for Best Fan Writer
 In 2008, The Last Colony was nominated for the Hugo Award for Best Novel
 In 2009, he won the Hugo Award for Best Related Book, for Your Hate Mail Will Be Graded: A Decade of Whatever 1998–2008 In 2009, METAtropolis was nominated for the Hugo Award for Best Dramatic Presentation, Long Form
 In 2009, Zoe's Tale was nominated for the Hugo Award for Best Novel, nominated for the Andre Norton Award for Best Young Adult Science Fiction/Fantasy, nominated for the Romantic Times Reviewer's Choice Award for Science Fiction Novel and a Locus Award finalist for Best Young Adult Bookl
 In 2009, "After the Coup" was a finalist for the Locus Award for Best Short Story
 In 2010, he received the Seiun Award for The Last Colony (Best Foreign Language Novel of the Year)
 In 2010, he received the Kurd-Laßwitz-Preis for The Android's Dream (Best Foreign Novel)
 In 2010, The God Engines was nominated for the Hugo Award for Best Novella, as well as the Nebula Award for Best Novella
 In 2012, he received the Audie Award for Best Science Fiction Audiobook for Fuzzy Nation as narrated by Wil Wheaton
 In 2013, he won the Hugo Award for Best Novel and the Locus Award for Best Science Fiction Novel, for Redshirts: A Novel with Three Codas In 2013, he won the Seiun Award for Best Foreign Language Novel of the Year for The Android's Dream In 2016, he won the Ohio Governor's Award for the Arts in the Individual Artists category
 In 2018, he won the Locus Award for Best Sci-Fi Novel for The Collapsing Empire and was nominated for the Hugo Award for Best Novel
 In 2020, he won the Dragon Award for Best Science Fiction Novel for The Last Emperox In 2023, he won the Robert A. Heinlein Award for "outstanding published works in science fiction and technical writings to inspire the human exploration of space."

 References 

 External links 

 
 
 
 John Scalzi at The Encyclopedia of Science Fiction''
 John Scalzi's column on AMCTV.com
 John Scalzi at Tor Books
 
 Authors @ Google presentation, April 2007
 John Scalzi on The Glenn & Helen Show
 "After the Coup" – complete story and reading by author at Tor.com

1969 births
21st-century American male writers
21st-century American non-fiction writers
21st-century American novelists
21st-century American short story writers
American bloggers
American columnists
American feminists
American film critics
American male bloggers
American male novelists
American male short story writers
American science fiction writers
American writers of Italian descent
Chapbook writers
Hugo Award-winning fan writers
Hugo Award-winning writers
John W. Campbell Award for Best New Writer winners
Living people
Los Angeles Times people
Male feminists
Military science fiction writers
Novelists from California
Novelists from Ohio
People from Bradford, Ohio
People from Fairfield, California
University of Chicago alumni
Video game writers